Mohamed Naim (born 7 October 1996) is a Maldivian professional footballer who plays as a forward, attacking midfielder or winger for Club Eagles and Maldives national team.

Club career
Naim played in the Minivan Championship for his island team K. Guraidhoo, before joining Club Eagles in 2017. On 7 May 2017, he scored his first senior goal for Club Eagles against New Radiant. It was the only goal in the match where Eagles won 1–0 in 2017 Malé League. He was also included in the Club Eagles U21 squad for the 2017 season and appeared in 2017 FAM Youth Championship, where his side won the championship for third consecutive time. He was included in the tournament's best 3 players.

On 16 October 2019, Naim tore his ACL during the Dhivehi Premier League win against Maziya, forcing him to sit on sidelines for 6 months.

International career
On 23 March 2018, Naim made his debut for the Maldives national team along with his elder brother Ahmed Numaan, at the National Stadium, Singapore, as an 80th-minute substitute for Hamza Mohamed in a friendly game where they lost 3–2 to Singapore. Naim traveled to India for the 2018 SAFF Championship with the Maldives team as a standby player with Abdulla Yaameen, but did not make it to the final 20-men by Croatian coach Petar Segrt.

Naim played in the 2019 Indian Ocean Island Games, and scored in the 3–1 loss against Mayotte in the last group stage game.

On 5 September 2019, Naim made his full debut for the national team in the 2022 FIFA World Cup qualification match against Guam at Dededo, where they won 1–0.

Personal life
Naim was born in Guraidhoo, Kaafu Atoll, on 7 October 1996. He has an elder brother, Ahmed Numaan, who is also a professional footballer playing for Club Eagles and Maldives national team with him.

Naim married his girlfriend Shaany Ibrahim on 28 March 2019.

Honours

Club
Club Eagles U21s
FAM Youth Championship: 2017

References

External links
 
 

1996 births
Living people
Maldivian footballers
Association football forwards
Maldives international footballers
Club Eagles players